Mishijan, also rendered as Meyshi Jan, Mashijan, Mishajan, Mishjan, Moshian, or Mushijan, may refer to:
 Mishijan-e Olya
 Mishijan-e Sofla